Briggs Marine is a marine services company based in the United Kingdom with operations throughout Europe, the Caspian Region and North America.

History

The Briggs Group became involved in the marine industry in the 1970s, providing workboats to marine construction works. By the 1980s, it was providing vessels and manpower for oil and gas terminal operations across the UK.

Since 2000, Briggs Group has moved into associated areas including subsea services, renewable energy services, moorings, environmental consultancy, survey work and diving services.

Briggs has held a contract with the Ministry of Defence since 2006 serving a single point mooring repair and maintenance in the Falkland Islands.

In 2007, the group agreed a 15-year, £100-million marine services support contract to provide navigation buoy maintenance and mooring support for the Royal Navy. To service the contract, Briggs Group commissioned the new MV Kingdom of Fife.

From 2012 until 2020, the company was contracted by Transport for London to manage the Woolwich Ferry operation on the River Thames. Briggs were involved in replacing the existing ferries with new vessels, which were constructed in Poland. They use a new mooring system installed at Woolwich and North Woolwich piers. Additionally, Briggs are managing the infrastructure upgrades required to berth and operate the new ferries. The new vessels entered service on 1 February 2019.

The commercial diving service was introduced in 2015, initially to support the company's marine projects particularly submarine cables, however, it now operates as an independent part of the business.

In 2016 Briggs contracted with Peel Ports to provide pilot transport in the Port of Liverpool.

In 2018 Briggs Marine was given a three-year contract by BP exploration worth over $4 million to provide fire and rescue services at Sangachal Terminal in Azerbaijan.

Fleet

References

External links
 Briggs Marine Official Website
 Article on Briggs Marine

Commercial diving contractors
Companies based in Fife
Transport companies of the United Kingdom
Transport companies established in 1972
1972 establishments in Scotland